Huston Township is a township in Blair County, Pennsylvania, United States. It is part of the Altoona, PA Metropolitan Statistical Area. The population was 1,251 at the 2020 census.

General information
ZIP code: 16662
Area code: 814
Local telephone exchange: 793

Geography
Huston Township is located in southeastern Blair County, between Tussey Mountain to the east and Lock Mountain to the west. Its eastern border is the Blair County–Huntingdon County line. It contains the census-designated places of Beavertown, Clappertown, Jugtown, and Oreminea.

Recreation
Portions of Pennsylvania State Game Lands Number 73 are located along the eastern border and Number 147 is located along the western border of the township.

Demographics

As of the census of 2000, there were 1,262 people, 452 households, and 340 families residing in the township.  The population density was 36.0 people per square mile (13.9/km).  There were 476 housing units at an average density of 13.6/sq mi (5.2/km).  The racial makeup of the township was 99.37% White, 0.32% African American, and 0.32% from two or more races. Hispanic or Latino of any race were 0.24% of the population.

There were 452 households, out of which 36.7% had children under the age of 18 living with them, 66.2% were married couples living together, 5.8% had a female householder with no husband present, and 24.6% were non-families. 21.2% of all households were made up of individuals, and 8.4% had someone living alone who was 65 years of age or older.  The average household size was 2.79 and the average family size was 3.27.

In the township the population was spread out, with 28.8% under the age of 18, 8.0% from 18 to 24, 28.3% from 25 to 44, 23.8% from 45 to 64, and 11.1% who were 65 years of age or older.  The median age was 35 years. For every 100 females, there were 100.3 males.  For every 100 females age 18 and over, there were 101.3 males.

The median income for a household in the township was $36,250, and the median income for a family was $44,063. Males had a median income of $25,577 versus $20,446 for females. The per capita income for the township was $15,688.  About 10.6% of families and 12.8% of the population were below the poverty line, including 16.6% of those under age 18 and 16.2% of those age 65 or over.

References

Populated places established in 1770
Townships in Blair County, Pennsylvania
Townships in Pennsylvania
1770 establishments in Pennsylvania